Ray White is an American soul vocalist and rock and blues guitarist.

Ray White may also refer to:

 D. Ray White (1927–1985), American mountain dancer and entertainer
 Ray Bridwell White (1892–1946), member of the Pillar of Fire Church in Zarephath, New Jersey, United States
 Ray White (baseball) (1910–1995), minor league baseball pitcher and manager
 Ray White (boxer) (born 1938), American light heavyweight boxer
 Ray White (cricketer) (born 1941), South African cricketer
 Ray White (footballer, born 1918) (1918–1988), English footballer
 Ray White (footballer, born 1941), English footballer
 Ray White (politician), politician in Nova Scotia, Canada

See also 
 Raymond White (disambiguation)